Mordechai Gifter (October 15, 1915 - January 18, 2001) was an American Haredi rabbi. He was the rosh yeshiva (dean) of the Telz Yeshiva in Cleveland, and among the foremost religious leaders of Orthodox Jewry in the late 20th century. 

Gifter studied in yeshivas in Lithuania, and held several rabbinical positions in the United States.

Early life
Mordechai Gifter was born in Portsmouth, Virginia to Yisrael and Matla (May) Gifter. He was raised in Baltimore, Maryland, where his father owned a grocery. He attended the Baltimore City Public Schools, at the time being known as Max, and received his religious education in after-school programs. He had a younger brother and sister, and both predeceased him.

As a young man, Gifter studied in the Rabbi Isaac Elchonon Theological Seminary of Yeshiva University (YU/RIETS) in New York, New York, under the tutelage of Moshe Aharon Poleyeff and Moshe Soloveichik. His uncle, Samuel Saar (Yehudah Leib), was the dean of the seminary. At the time, Avigdor Miller, also a Baltimore native, was learning in RIETS. On Saar's advice, Gifter traveled in 1932 to Lithuania on the same boat as Miller to study in the Telshe Yeshiva. Gifter was immediately accepted for admission and placed in advanced classes. He developed a strong bond with Zalman Bloch, the mashgiach ruchani (spiritual supervisor) at the yeshiva. He eventually became engaged to Bloch's daughter. In 1939, prior to his wedding, Gifter returned home to the United States to visit his parents in Baltimore. He planned on returning to Lithuania for his wedding and to resume his studies.

When it became obvious that he would be unable to return due to the political climate of the late 1930s, Gifter arranged for his bride's family to join him in the United States. Only his bride came; the family chose not to abandon their community in its time of greatest need. The Gifters married in Baltimore, with Mrs. Gifter's family still in war-torn Lithuania. One of the witnesses at Gifter's wedding was Bernard Lander, then a rabbi in Baltimore and later founder of Touro College.

Career
Shortly thereafter, Gifter was appointed to the pulpit of the Nusach Ari Synagogue in northwest Baltimore. He soon became well known as an invigorating speaker and refined orator. His lectures and addresses became popular throughout the Baltimore area, and his national reputation began to grow as well. In addition to his rabbinic position, Gifter was appointed an adjunct lecturer at the expanding Ner Israel Rabbinical College headed by Yaakov Yitzchok Ruderman. He was the first native Baltimorean to lead a congregation in the city. 

In 1941, Gifter moved to Waterbury, Connecticut and assumed a rabbinic pulpit in that community. In 1944, Gifter moved to Cleveland, Ohio to join the faculty of his alma mater, the newly re-established Rabbinical College of Telshe, which was moved from Telshe, Lithuania to Cleveland. The original school and Telshe community were almost completely destroyed by the Nazis and Lithuanian militia. In 1964, he was appointed as dean together with Boruch Sorotzkin. 

In 1977, Gifter brought 20 students from Cleveland to Israel and opened a branch of the college in the town of Kiryat Ye'arim (Telz-Stone), leaving Sorotzkin in charge of the Cleveland campus. In addition to teaching his students, Gifter delivered a shiur (Torah lecture) on the Minchas Chinuch on Fridays in Jerusalem, attracting many Torah scholars. Notes from that shiur were eventually compiled in a sefer (book) called Pitei Mincha. When Sorotzkin died in 1979, Gifter was sent back to the United States to lead the Cleveland campus and the Israeli branch closed. 

Gifter never recovered from the tremendous loss that he felt for his first love, Eretz Yisrael (the Land of Israel). He did not return to his on-campus residence, but moved into small quarters in the students' dormitory to accentuate his feeling of being in golus (exile).

For many years, Gifter led the Moetzes Gedolei HaTorah (presidium and leadership council) of Agudath Israel of America. He maintained a relationship with his first faculty position at Ner Israel Rabbinical College, returning to Baltimore annually to visit his daughter and son-in-law and friends.

Gifter died in 2001, having suffered numerous ailments for many years prior to his death. He was eulogized by Dovid Barkin, among others.

Family
Gifter was survived by his wife, three sons and three daughters. His eldest son, Binyomin, is working together with his brothers Yisroel of Lakewood, New Jersey and Shmuel Zalman to publish the works of their father. Gifter's sons-in-law are: Ephraim Eisenberg, who served as lecturer and Associate Dean of Ner Israel Rabbinical College in Baltimore prior to his death in 2002; Yaakov Reisman, Rav of Congregation Agudath Yisroel of Long Island in Far Rockaway, New York; and Avrohom Chaim Feuer, a writer, author and lecturer from Sha'arei Hesed, Jerusalem, and former rav of Kehillas Beis Avrohom of Monsey, New York.

Controversy
As a leading Haredi scholar, Gifter frequently addressed controversial topics. In one lecture, he sharply berated Haskel Lookstein for his condemnation of Elazar Shach's criticism of Adin Steinsaltz.

Works

Writings
Gifter was a prolific writer. As a young man he authored articles on some of the most complicated issues in Jewish Law, which were published in the Talmudic law Journal of Tzvi Pesach Frank.

He published numerous books  on Jewish Law, philosophy, theology and bible. He was a frequent contributor to many scholarly journals, and once wrote an article for the Western Reserve University Law Review.

Among his books are:

Hebrew:
Pirkei Torah - Commentary on the Bible.
Hirhurei Teshuva - Commentary on Maimonides' Laws of Repentance.
Pitei Mincha - Commentary on the Minchas Chinuch.
Pirkei Iyun - Commentary on the Talmudic Tractate Makkos.
Pirkei Moed - Commentary on the Festivals.

English:
Torah Perspectives - Essay on a variety of topics.
Pirkei Torah - Commentary on the Bible.

Lectures
Gifter was one of the electrifying speakers in the Jewish world. It is said that after he gave a speech at Northwestern University he was offered a professorship, which he declined.

References

External links
 Kolel Ateres Mordechai Mordechai Gifter's publications
 Torah Downloads Lectures
 Torah Anytime More lectures

1915 births
2001 deaths
20th-century American male writers
20th-century American rabbis
American Haredi rabbis
Authors of works on the Talmud
Burials at the Jewish cemetery on the Mount of Olives
Jewish American writers
Rabbis from Maryland
Rabbis from Ohio
Rabbis from Virginia
Religious leaders from Cleveland
Religious leaders from Richmond, Virginia
Rosh yeshivas
Moetzes Gedolei HaTorah
Writers from Baltimore
Writers from Cleveland
Writers from Waterbury, Connecticut